The Huangjuewan interchange is a 5 level interchange in Chongqing, China. Construction started in September 2009 and was completed in 2017.

References 

Nan'an District
2017 establishments in China